Bronislava Dobiášová (born 27 April 1998) is a Slovak figure skater, the 2014 senior national champion. She represented Slovakia at the 2014 World Junior Championships in Sofia, Bulgaria. She qualified for the free skate and finished 23rd. She trains mainly in Nové Mesto nad Váhom.

Programs

Competitive highlights 
CS: Challenger Series; JGP: Junior Grand Prix

References

External links 
 

1998 births
Slovak female single skaters
Living people
Sportspeople from Trenčín
Competitors at the 2019 Winter Universiade